Louis Eugène Bonnet (6 October 1815 – 26 November 1892) was  French doctor and politician who was  Senator of Ain from 1876 to 1885.

Life

Louis Eugène Bonnet was born in Jujurieux, Ain, on 6 October 1815.
He obtained a doctorate in medicine at Paris, then for some time worked as an internal surgeon in the hospitals of Lyon.
He then returned to Ain  to practice medicine.
He became a general councilor for the canton of Poncin, Ain.

Senator

On 30 January 1876 Bonnet was elected senator of Ain.
He joined the moderate left.
In June 1877 he voted against the dissolution of the Chamber of Deputies.
He fought the government of May 16th with the Republican minority.
In 1879 he supported the ministry of Jules Armand Dufaure.
On 9 March 1890 he voted for article 7 of Jules Ferry's project for free higher education.
On 9 July he voted for amnesty for the members of the Paris Commune.
In February 1883 he voted for the bill on expulsion of the princes.
In 1884 he voted for reestablishment of divorce.

Last years

Bonnet did not run for reelection on 25 January 1885.
After retiring from public life he returned to his birthplace.
He died in Jujurieux, Ain, on 26 November 1892 at the age of 77.

Publications

Notes

Sources

1815 births
1892 deaths
Senators of Ain
French Senators of the Third Republic